The Cholita Climbers of Bolivia are a group of Aymara women who summit different mountains all throughout Latin America while wearing their traditional dresses. The group was formed in 2015, and the women are all part of a tight knit community who work and live in the mountains. Their most recent expedition has become their most notable, as on January 23, 2019 they became the first Aymara women to summit Aconcagua.

History 
The Bolivian group of climbers live in the cities of La Paz and El Alto, and range from the ages of 24 to 50 years old. Most of them are married to climbers and worked in the mountains as cooks and porters. They started their journey in 2015 when 11 cholitas, led by mountain cook Lidia Huayllas Estrada, made it to the summit of the Huayna Potosí in a single attempt. From that moment they decided to form the Cholita Climbers and climb mountains all over Latin America.

The beginning was very bumpy for these dedicated women as they really had no prior experience in climbing, and only knew what they picked up from watching their partners and other tourists and climbers. To add to the stress they were also heavily judged by others for being woman as it is very uncommon, but thankfully they have the support of their partners and family.

After that they summited Acotango and three more mountains, all higher than 6000 meters above sea level.

In 2017 they reached the peak of the most emblematic mountain in the department of La Paz, Illimani (6,462 meters). This was the most difficult summit for the ladies as it took 3 whole days. They first reached the base camp, then the high camp, and finally they reached the top the next day by 8am.

After this expedition it was no longer just a hobby for the Cholitas as in June they began accompanying tourists on their climbs as regular guides. They are also now taking professional climbing and safety courses to become professional guides.

On January 23, 2019 they made history by reaching their highest summit on their first international climb in Argentina. They climbed Aconcagua (6,960, 8 meters) in Mendoza (Argentina) the highest summit in the western hemisphere. The climb was sponsored by the Ministry of Culture and Tourism of Bolivia as they are to be a part of a documentary that will premier in Spain.

The Cholita Climbers do have plans for more summits but lack the funds to do so. They are now working to somehow make profit from what they do in order to fund things like equipment and guides.

Notable People 
Though the group is made of 15 members these are the ones who made the 2019 summit in Argentina

 Lidia Huayllas Estrada (leader/ spokesperson)
 Estrada Dora Magueño Machaca
 Ana Lía Gonzales Magueño 
 Cecilia Llusco Alaña
 Elena Quispe Tincuta

Clothing 
To stay true to who they are and show the world what Cholitas are truly capable of the climbers wear their traditional skirts throughout the whole entire summit. Of course, they also wear classic climbing accessories to assure their safety such as: boots, crampons, harness, helmet and ropes. And, to carry all their extra essentials and gear they wear colorful aguayos around their shoulders.

References  

Climbing organizations